Mateh Kola (also Romanized as Mateh Kolā; also known as Mat Kalā and Mat Kolā) is a village in Farim Rural District, Dodangeh District, Sari County, Mazandaran Province, Iran. At the 2006 census, its population was 82, in 22 families.

References 

Populated places in Sari County